Diamond Valley is a town in the Calgary Metropolitan Region of Alberta, Canada within Foothills County. It is at the intersection of Highway 22 (Cowboy Trail) and Highway 7. It was established through the provincially approved amalgamation of the former towns of Black Diamond and Turner Valley on January 1, 2023.

History 

Black Diamond and Turner Valley incorporated as villages on May 8, 1929 and February 23, 1930 respectively. After nearly 26 years as a village, Black Diamond incorporated as a town on January 1, 1956. Turner Valley incorporated as a town on September 1, 1977 after 47 years of village status.

The thought of amalgamating the towns of Black Diamond and Turner Valley first surfaced in the mid-1980s. Turner Valley withdrew from the discussions after Alberta Municipal Affairs completed a feasibility report on the amalgamation in 1986.

The possibility resurfaced in 2006 when the towns initiated discussions on a possible amalgamation of the two municipalities. The discussions culminated in a plebiscite held on October 15, 2007, concurrently with their municipal elections, in which the question asked of voters was "Do you support an amalgamation of the Town of Black Diamond and the Town of Turner Valley to form one municipality?" The results of the plebiscite were 66% of Turner Valley voters were in favour of amalgamation, while 71% of Black Diamond voters were against amalgamation.

A third amalgamation investigation began in early 2016 through a joint request of Black Diamond and Turner Valley for a provincial grant to undertake a feasibility study. Following negotiations and engagement, the two town councils decided to proceed with an amalgamation application in September 2021. The name of the amalgamated municipality was proposed to be the Town of Diamond Valley. Among over 200 name suggestions, Diamond Valley received the majority of responses in a survey of three shortlisted suggestions; the other two being Sheep River and Black Valley. The proposed effective date of the amalgamation was January 1, 2023. On May 25, 2022, the Government of Alberta approved the amalgamation application with the municipality name and effective date as originally proposed.

Demographics 
The combined population of the towns of Black Diamond and Turner Valley, according to the 2021 Census of Population conducted by Statistics Canada, is 5,341.

Black Diamond

Turner Valley

Government 
The Town of Diamond Valley will have a seven-person council comprising a mayor and six councillors all elected at-large. The first election is scheduled for November 28, 2022. Its chief administrative officer (CAO) will be Shawn Patience, who is currently the CAO of the Town of Turner Valley.

The first council of Diamond Valley, based on the official results of the election, held November 28, 2022:

 Mayor, Barry Crane
 Councillor, Jonathan Gordon
 Councillor, Cindy Holladay
 Councillor, Brendan Kelly
 Councillor, Veronica Kloiber
 Councillor, Hazel Martin
 Councillor, Heather Thomson

See also 
List of communities in Alberta
List of former urban municipalities in Alberta
List of municipal amalgamations in Alberta
List of towns in Alberta

References

External links 

2023 establishments in Alberta
Calgary Region
Towns in Alberta
Populated places established in 2023